Two tiger attacks occurred at the San Francisco Zoo, in 2006 and 2007, both involving a female Siberian tiger named Tatiana (June 27, 2003 – December 25, 2007). In the first incident, a zookeeper was bitten on the arm during a public feeding. In the second incident, one person was killed and two others were injured before police shot and killed Tatiana on the scene.

Background

Tatiana was born at the Denver Zoo on June 25, 2003, and was brought to the San Francisco Zoo on December 16, 2005, to provide the 14-year-old Siberian tiger, Tony, with a mate. Tatiana had no prior record of aggression towards humans.

First attack
On December 22, 2006, as veteran zookeeper Lori Komejan was feeding Tatiana through the enclosure's grill, Tatiana clawed and pulled Komejan's right arm through the grill and bit it.

The California Occupational Safety and Health Administration later determined that the zoo had inadequate safety precautions and staff training and fined it $18,000.
Komejanwho underwent several surgeries and skin grafts and whose arm was severely scarred and permanently impaired sued the zoo, settling in 2008SF Settles with Zoo Keeper Mauled by Tiger, January 17, 2009, Bay City News. on undisclosed terms.SF zookeeper mauled by tiger settles lawsuit, San Diego Union-Tribune, January 16, 2009.

The tiger cage was remodeled and re-opened in September 2007.

Second attack 
Shortly after closing time on December 25, 2007, Tatiana escaped from her open-air enclosure,  killing 17-year-old Carlos Eduardo Sousa Jr. and injuring brothers Amritpal "Paul" Dhaliwal and Kulbir Dhaliwal (19 and 23 years old, respectively). The three men had been witnessed throwing objects at and taunting the animal. 
An employee heard their screams and called 9-1-1 at 5:07 pm.

The emergency response was delayed, first because cafe employees said in their call that they suspected that the screaming person was mentally ill and that there was no actual animal attack, and later because zoo security guards were enforcing a lockdown to prevent Tatiana from escaping the zoo grounds.

Armed officials found Tatiana with Kulbir Dhaliwal, but held fire at first for fear of hitting Dhaliwal. They created a distraction which caused the tiger to turn towards the officers, who shot her through the forehead.Read Tiger Attack Autopsy, June 2, 2008.  KGO-TV San Francisco, ABC News.
The Dhaliwal brothers received deep bites and claw wounds on their heads, necks, arms, and hands. They left the hospital on December 29.
Sousa was found dead near the tiger grotto with blunt-force injuries to his head and neck; many punctures and scratches to his head, neck and chest; skull and spinal fractures; and a cut to his jugular vein.

The Association of Zoos and Aquariums said the attack was the first time a visitor had been killed by an escaped animal at a member zoo since the Association's founding in 1924.
The zoo was closed until January 3, 2008.

Investigation 
It was not immediately apparent how Tatiana had escaped, but police said that Tatiana may have "leaped" or "climbed" the walls of her enclosure. Police undertook an investigation to determine whether one of the victims climbed over a waist-high fence and then dangled a leg or other body part over the edge of a moat around the tiger enclosure.

Tatiana's rear paws were embedded with concrete chips, suggesting that she had pushed against the moat wall during her escape.

In the days immediately following the attack, the director of the zoo stated that Tatiana was probably provoked. He said, "Somebody created a situation that really agitated her and gave her some sort of a method to break out. There is no possible way the cat could have made it out of there in a single leap. I would surmise that there was help. A couple of feet dangling over the edge could possibly have done it." Sources told the San Francisco Chronicle that pine cones and sticks that might have been thrown at Tatiana had been found and which could not have landed in the vicinity naturally. Paul Dhaliwal later said that the three had yelled and waved at the tiger. According to early news sources, the Dhaliwal brothers had slingshots on them at the time of the attack. In later reports, the police denied that slingshots were found in the victims' car or at the zoo. Zoo visitor Jennifer Miller and her family allegedly saw the group of men, including an unidentified fourth person, taunting lions less than an hour before the tiger attack. She later identified Carlos Sousa as being part of the group but said Sousa did not join in the taunting.  An attorney representing the Dhaliwal brothers stated that they had not taunted the tiger.

In early January 2008, the lead investigator for the city said that the men may have harassed Tatiana, but no charges were filed against them for such behavior. Taunting a zoo animal is a misdemeanor in San Francisco.

Toxicology reports disclosed in mid-January indicated a blood alcohol level of 0.16 for 19-year-old Amritpal Dhaliwal, twice the legal limit for operating a motor vehicle, and that alcohol was also present but under the legal limits for Kulbir Dhaliwal, 23, and for Carlos Sousa, 17. There was also evidence of cannabis use amongst all three.  Reporters also noted that "[p]olice found a small amount of marijuana in Kulbir Dhaliwal's 2002 BMW, which the victims drove to the zoo, as well as a partially filled bottle of vodka, according to court documents."

The San Francisco Chronicle described the attitude of the Dhaliwals as "hostile" to the police following the attack, reporting that they initially refused to identify themselves or Carlos Sousa to the police, refused to give interviews to the police until two days after the attack, and would not speak publicly about the details of what happened to them.

Changes

On February 16, 2008, the zoo re-opened the exterior tiger exhibit which was extensively renovated to meet the extension of the concrete moat wall up to the minimum height of 16 feet 4 inches from the bottom of the moat, installation of glass fencing on the top of the wall to extend the height to 19 feet, and installation of electrified "hotwire".

The zoo also installed portable loudspeakers that remind visitors to leave promptly at the 5 p.m. closing time and "Protect the Animals" signs that read:
Help make the zoo a safe environment. The magnificent animals in the zoo are wild and possess all their natural instincts. You are a guest in their home. Please remember they are sensitive and have feelings. PLEASE don't tap on glass, throw anything into exhibits, make excessive noise, tease or call out to them.Yollin, Patricia, et al. S.F. Zoo visitor saw 2 victims of tiger attack teasing lions, January 3, 2008. San Francisco Chronicle, print edition; also online at SFGate.com.

Subsequent events
On December 25, 2008, a life-size concrete-and-tile sculpture of Tatiana, by Jon Engdahl, was unveiledKoopman, John. Sculpture of Tatiana the tiger unveiled, December 26, 2008, San Francisco Chronicle, p. B-2; also in online edition at SFGate.Com. at the community garden on the Greenwich Steps at 274 Greenwich.

Four police officersScott Biggs, Yukio Oshita, Kevin O'Leary and Daniel Krooswere honored for bravery during the incident.Lagos, Marisa.  Cops who shot tiger to be recognized as heroes, January 16, 2009, "City Insider" column, San Francisco Chronicle via SF Gate.

In 2009 a suit by the Dhaliwal brothers against the zoo was settled for $900,000;
one by Sousa's parents was settled on undisclosed terms.

Both Dhaliwal brothers subsequently got into trouble with the law. Paul Dhaliwal died in 2012 at age 24.

References

External links

  collection of articles and related media

2003 animal births
2007 animal deaths
Individual tigers
Deaths due to animal attacks in the United States
Deaths due to tiger attacks
Accidental deaths in California
Animals shot dead by law enforcement officers in the United States

2007 in California
Zoos in California
History of San Francisco
2007 in San Francisco